Achromobacter cholinophagum is a Gram-negative bacterium of the genus Achromobacter.

References 

Burkholderiales